Nicolaas Jacobus Janse van Rensburg (born 6 May 1994) is a South African professional rugby union player, currently playing with  in the French Top 14. His regular position is lock.

Career

Youth

As a result of the latter, he earned a call-up to the South African Schools side in 2012, where he started in two of their matches, against Wales and England

In 2013, he was included in the  squad for the 2013 Under-19 Provincial Championship.

He was selected in the South Africa Under-20 squad that participated at the 2014 IRB Junior World Championship. He started in all five their matches during the competition – after featuring in their pool stage victories over Scotland, New Zealand and Samoa, which saw South Africa qualify for the finals, he then started their semi-final against New Zealand and the final against England, but couldn't prevent them suffering a 21–20 defeat in the final.

Blue Bulls

Janse van Rensburg made his first class debut during the 2014 Vodacom Cup competition when he played off the bench in a match against  in Pretoria.

Montpellier

Janse van Rensburg moved to France in 2016 to join Top 14 side .

South Africa 'A' 
In 2021, Janse van Resnburg was included in the South Africa 'A' team that played against the touring British and Irish Lions team. He came on as a replacement in their match in Cape Town, ending on the winning side as the South Africa 'A' team ran out 17–13 winners.

References

External links
 Nico Janse van Rensburg on itsrugby.co.uk.

South African rugby union players
Living people
1994 births
Rugby union players from Pretoria
Rugby union locks
Blue Bulls players
Bulls (rugby union) players
Montpellier Hérault Rugby players
South Africa Under-20 international rugby union players
Expatriate rugby union players in France
South African expatriate sportspeople in France
South African expatriate rugby union players
South Africa international rugby union players